This article lists the results for the Scotland national football team from 2020 to present.

Key 

Key to matches
Att. = Match attendance
(H) = Home ground
(A) = Away ground
(N) = Neutral ground

Key to record by opponent
Pld = Games played
W = Games won
D = Games drawn
L = Games lost
GF = Goals for
GA = Goals against

Results and scheduled fixtures 
Scotland's score is shown first in each case.

Notes

Record by opponent

Notes

References

External links
 RSSSF: Scotland – International Results
 Scotland – International Results
 Scottish Football Association: History Archives

2020
2019–20 in Scottish football
2020–21 in Scottish football
2021–22 in Scottish football
2022–23 in Scottish football